John Rochester (May 22, 1822 – September 19, 1894) was a Canadian industrialist, mayor of Ottawa, Ontario from 1870 to 1871, and a member of the House of Commons of Canada representing Carleton from 1872 to 1882.

He was born at Rouses Point, New York in 1822 and first came to Bytown with his family in 1827. He was the son of John Rochester Sr., born in Berwick on Tweed, England in 1786, and his wife Barbara Young, born 1790 in Sunderland, Northumbria, England. There were nine offspring: Susanah (James Anderson), James (Ann Frost), Elizabeth (McLaughlin), George (Marion Baillie), John Jr. (Elizabeth Bevitt), Mary Ann (George Honey Preston), Emily (Cressle, Norman), William (Helen Baillie), Margaret (William Bunting). The Rochesters were a pioneer family in early Bytown that branched out into timber and mining enterprise across the Canadian shield. Many Rochesters had distinguished military careers.

Other early Ottawa Valley names, besides marriages listed above, connected to the Rochester family include: Cole, McDougal, Church, McLaren, and Bryson, to name but a few.

He and elder brother James established a brewery (which he took over in 1856 and sold to James in 1870) and he also opened a tannery at that time and operated two sawmills at Chaudière Falls on the shore of the Ottawa River in the Lebreton Flats area of Ottawa. The area, south of Lebreton and bounded today by Bronson, Booth, Rochester and Preston Streets was once Rochesterville before amalgamation with Ottawa.

John Rochester Jr. was for 11 years a member of Ottawa City Council. He was a staunch Wesleyan Methodist and helped establish a local order of the Orange Lodge and was also a Freemason.  He co-founded the Ottawa Free Press, was vice-president of the Ottawa Agricultural Insurance Company and was a partner with former Ottawa Mayor John Bower Lewis in the Metropolitan Trust and Loan Company.

In 1845, he married Elizabeth Ann Bevitt. He served as president of the Ottawa Saint George's Society and the Ottawa Ladies' College. Rochester died in Ottawa at the age of 72 after suffering for several weeks from a kidney ailment.

Electoral record

References 

1822 births
1894 deaths
Mayors of Ottawa
Members of the House of Commons of Canada from Ontario
Conservative Party of Canada (1867–1942) MPs
Canadian Methodists
American emigrants to pre-Confederation Ontario
Ottawa city councillors
19th-century Methodists
People from Rouses Point, New York
Immigrants to Upper Canada